, literally: Story of Tetsuharu Kawakami: number 16, is a 1957 black-and-white Japanese film directed by Eisuke Takizawa.

The film is about Japanese baseball player Tetsuharu Kawakami.

Cast
 Shinoda Yoshihiro (信田義弘) as Tetsuharu Kawakami (a boy)
 Shinsuke Maki (牧真介) as Tetsuharu Kawakami (youth)
 Tetsuharu Kawakami as himself
 Akira Kobayashi
 and others

References

1957 films
1950s sports films
Japanese black-and-white films
Films directed by Eisuke Takizawa
Nikkatsu films
Japanese baseball films
1950s Japanese films